The Statue of Cecil John Rhodes in Bulawayo, Zimbabwe is a bronze sculpture of a British colonialist, businessman and politician who was the founder of British South Africa Company through which he founded the southern African territory of Rhodesia.

The statue was sculpted by a Scottish sculptor John Tweed and was erected in Bulawayo city centre in 1904. In February 1981 after Zimbabwe's independence in 1980, the statue was removed from the city center to the centenary park at the Natural History Museum of Zimbabwe.

See alslo
Timeline of Bulawayo

References

Sculptures
Bronze sculptures
Sculptures of men
Statues
Cultural depictions of Cecil Rhodes